Edmund Charles Butler (3 June 1881 – 24 February 1945) was an Australian rules footballer who played with South Melbourne in the Victorian Football League (VFL).

He served on Dandenong Council for fifteen years and was active in public affairs in the Dandenong area for many years.

Notes

External links 

1881 births
1945 deaths
Australian rules footballers from Victoria (Australia)
Sydney Swans players
Mordialloc Football Club players
People from Dandenong, Victoria